Joseph Larmor (1857–1942) was a British physicist and mathematician.

Larmor may also refer to:

 Larmor (crater), on the Moon
 LARMOR neutron microscope, a planned microscope based on neutron scattering
 Larmor precession and Larmor frequency, the precession of the magnetic moment
 Larmor formula, to calculate the total power radiated by a non relativistic point charge as it accelerates or decelerates
 Larmor radius, the radius of the circular motion of a charged particle in the presence of a uniform magnetic field
 Larmor's theorem, by Joseph Larmor
 Maria Lamor, Spanish actress

See also 
 Lamour (disambiguation)